James Nathaniel  Halbert  was an Irish entomologist. He was born 30 August 1872 and died 7 May 1948 in Dalkey, Dublin, Ireland.

In 1892, Halbert began work at the Science and Art Museum, in Dublin (now the National Museum of Ireland). He was appointed Technical Assistant in 1904 and then Assistant Naturalist, in place of George Herbert Carpenter, a few months later.
His first publications were on Coleoptera and appeared in the Irish Naturalist starting in 1892. He also worked with other insects, mainly Neuroptera and Hemiptera. He also worked with fresh water mites, described more than forty insect species and subspecies from Ireland, and was the author of several new genera.

Selected works
With  William Frederick Johnson, A list of the beetles of Ireland. Proceedings of the Royal Irish Academy 6B: 535-827 (1902).
With  James John Francis Xavier King, A list of the Neuroptera of Ireland. Proceedings of the Royal Irish Academy 28B: 29-112  (1910).
A list of the Irish Hemiptera (Heteroptera and Cicadina). Proceedings of the Royal Irish Academy 42B: 211-318 (1935).
List of Irish fresh-water mites (Hydracarina) Proceedings of the Royal Irish Academy  50, B, 4:39-103  (1944)

References
Beirne, in Irish Naturalists Journal, 9, 1948, pp. 168–171.

External links
 

1871 births
1948 deaths
Irish entomologists
Scientists from Dublin (city)
People from Dalkey